Egypt competed at the 2022 World Games held in Birmingham, United States from 7 to 17 July 2022. Athletes representing Egypt won three gold medals, two silver medals and one bronze medal. The country finished in 22nd place in the medal table. Most medals were won in karate.

Medalists

Competitors
The following is the list of number of competitors in the Games.

Aerobic gymnastics

Egypt competed in aerobic gymnastics.

Cue sports

Egypt won one silver medal in cue sports.

Finswimming

Egypt competed in finswimming.

Karate

Egypt won four medals in karate.

Men

Women

Orienteering

Egypt competed in orienteering.

Powerlifting

Egypt competed in powerlifting.

Sumo

Egypt won one gold medal in sumo. The sumo team was banned from competing in the remaining sumo events after "poor sportsmanship".

Wushu

Egypt competed in wushu.

References

Nations at the 2022 World Games
2022
World Games